The discography of Kutless, a Christian rock band, consists of 8 studio albums and 24 singles.

Albums

Studio albums

Extended plays
 Twenty (2022)

Miscellaneous releases

Music videos

All videos copyright BEC Recordings 2002-2009

Non-album tracks
"More Than It Seems" - Music Inspired by The Chronicles of Narnia: The Lion, the Witch and the Wardrobe (2005)

Singles

References

Discographies of American artists
Christian music discographies